The Zimbabwean honours system was instituted in late 1980 to replace the Rhodesian honours system.  The first award that was instituted was the Independence Medal, which was awarded to those who were involved in the Zimbabwean independence commemorations in some way.  The Zimbabwean honours system includes a range of orders, gallantry decorations, gallantry medals, and service medals.

National orders

 The Zimbabwe Order of Merit
  (military)
  (civil)
 The Order of the Great Zimbabwe
 The Royal Order of Munhumutapa
 The Order of the Star of Zimbabwe

Bravery awards

  Gold Cross of Zimbabwe
  Silver Cross of Zimbabwe
  Bronze Cross of Zimbabwe
 Medal for Meritorious Service
 Commendation Medal

Commemorative awards

  Liberation Decoration
  Liberation Medal
  Independence Medal
 The Mozambique Campaign Medal
 The Democratic Republic of Congo Campaign Medal

Service awards

 Long and Exemplary Service Medal (Zimbabwe)
  Public Service Long Service Medal (Zimbabwe)
 Efficiency Medal (Zimbabwe)
 President's Medal for Shooting (Zimbabwe)
 Service Medal (Zimbabwe)

References

 
Zimbabwe and the Commonwealth of Nations